Micromyrtus serrulata is a plant species of the family Myrtaceae endemic to Western Australia.

It blooms between June and November producing white flowers.

It is found in the Goldfields-Esperance region of Western Australia between Menzies to south east of Kalgoorlie where it grows in sandy to clay soils granite.

References

serrulata
Flora of Western Australia
Plants described in 1980